Vetle Fiskerstrand (born 14 March 2000) is a Norwegian football striker who plays for Florø.

Hailing from Sula, he grew up in the club Langevåg IL and played several senior matches in 2016 and a couple in 2017. In 2018 he joined the junior team of Aalesunds FK. He made his senior debut in the 2019 1. divisjon in April 2019, and his 2020 Eliteserien debut in July 2020. In November 2020 he scored his first Eliteserien goal. Ahead of the 2021 season he went on to Florø SK.

His father Arnt Vidar Fiskerstrand got 341 games for Aalesund across all competitions. His father coached Vetle's successive teams from age 6 to 16.

References

2000 births
Living people
Sportspeople from Møre og Romsdal
Norwegian footballers
Aalesunds FK players
Florø SK players
Norwegian First Division players
Eliteserien players
Association football forwards